The Departmental Council of Pyrénées-Orientales (formerly: General Council of the Pyrénées-Orientales) is the deliberative assembly of the Pyrénées-Orientales department in the region of Occitanie, in France. Its 34  are elected every 6 years. Each of the 17 cantons of the Pyrénées-Orientales provides two members of this assembly, a woman and a man who are elected together.

Organization

President 
The chairwoman of General Council of Pyrénées-Orientales is Hermeline Malherbe-Laurent (PS), who succeeded Christian Bourquin in November 2010.

Former presidents 

 Guy Male  1982 - 1987
 Rene Marques 1987 - 1998
 Christian Bourquin (PS) 1998 – 2010

The Vice-Presidents 
 Jean-Jacques Lopez (PS)
 Jean Vila (PC)
 Robert Garrab (PS)
 Henri Demay (PS)
 Louis Caseilles (PS)
 Alexandre Reynal (PS)
 Alain Boyer (PS)
 Jean-Louis Alvarez (PC)
 Jean Codognès (DVG)

The General Council 
The Assembly sets departmental policy. The General Council has 31
Conseillers généraux for the 31 Cantons of the Pyrénées-Orientales and its chairman.
The Conseiller général is the representative, elected by universal suffrage for 6 years.

The powers of the General Council 
The General Councils exercise the powers given by the laws of decentralization in the social welfare, the roads and water network, education, fire and rescue services, economic development, public museums, departmental archives, and the management of protected areas.

Social welfare 
 The Revenu de solidarité active, or RSA is to replace in 2009, the Revenu minimum d'insertion or RMI, the "Allocation de parent isolé" (API) to help Single-parent, the "prime pour l'emploi" or (PPE) an allocation to help working poor.
 The Office of Public Housing of Pyrénées-Orientales

Roads and public transport 
 The 1 € bus network
 The management of the road network in the Pyrénées-Orientales

Education and sport 
 The management of school canteens and 30 collèges of Pyrénées-Orientales
 Two bibliobus that crisscross the department
 The Médiathèque départementale Claude Simon.
 The 40 "sports departmental committees", and the Sports Health Center.
 Financial support for the USAP, and Catalans Dragons

Economic development 

 The "Platform Multimodale Pyrenees Mediterranean" 
 The departmental committee of tourism
 The THEMIS solar power plant

Culture and heritage of the Pyrénées-Orientales 
 Partner of Musée d'Art Moderne de Céret the art museum of Céret,
 The Palace of the Kings of Majorca
 The Château Royal de Collioure
 The Serrabone Priory
 Participation in the cultural network "Réseau culturel Terre Catalane".

Environmental protection and sustainable development 
 Partner of the Parc naturel régional des Pyrénées Catalanes
 Partner of "syndicat mixte grand Site Canigó" that manages the Canigou range
 management of Paulillesprotected area
 The Regional Natural Reserve of Nyer
 The Natural Marine Reserve of Banyuls-Cerbère

The Eurodistrict 
The General Council has a policy of cooperation with the Generalitat of Catalonia, the Province of Girona and Andorra to create a Catalan Eurodistrict.

July 27, 2007 in Céret took place the signature of the framework agreement for launching the Eurodistrict project
Establishment of a Common Fund to support projects of cooperation across the Catalan space, and common development of cross-border projects, the General Council and the Casa de la Generalitat de Catalunya in Perpignan.

Catalan language 
A study in 1997 found that 55% of the population understand, 39% can read and 34% can speak Catalan. It found a higher percentage of speakers in villages and lower in the capital city. Although Catalan has no official status it was first recognised in 1951 when it was introduced into the school curriculum. The Region of Languedoc-Roussillon created an agency for the promotion of the two regional languages, Catalan and Occitan.

At the session of 10 December 2007, the General Council approved the "Charter for Catalan" in which the Pyrénées-Orientales is committed to ensure the promotion, development and dissemination of the Catalan language and the Catalan culture.
It says in the Preamble: "Catalan, is born more than a thousand years, is one of the pillars of our identity, heritage and richness of the department of Pyrénées-Orientales (Northern Catalonia).
The term Northern Catalonia gets its first official recognition.

Automatic defibrillators 

The Pyrénées-Orientales is conducting a pilot study of installation of automatic defibrillators. On April 2, 2007, the General Council first decided to purchase defibrillators for 22 municipalities located more than 20 minutes from emergency medical services. Since March 2008, when a defibrillator was installed in Mosset, 141 municipalities have them, the objective being to equip all 226 municipalities and the 22 General Council buildings. Certain municipalities have also decided to install additional defibrillators at highly frequented locations.

After a presentation to the French Council of Mayors, other French departments and regions are also considering the installation of automatic defibrillators.

The devices require a telephone line and an ADSL connection, and their ground support equipment makes use of GPS. Thus their installation also helps to reduce the digital divide in formerly poorly connected villages.

See also 
 Languedoc-Roussillon

Notes

References
 Sheet presentation of Eurodistrict in french and Catalan
 Charter for the Catalan

External links 

 Conseil départemental des Pyrénées-Orientales
 INTERREG cross-border projects in progress

Pyrénées-Orientales
Cultural regions
Departmental councils (France)